No More, No Less is the first album by the Youngstown, Ohio band Blue Ash, released in 1973 on Mercury Records SRM1-666. (see 1973 in music). The album is composed mostly of originals with two covers, "Dusty Old Fairgrounds" by Bob Dylan and "Any Time at All" by The Beatles. The album remained out of print for many years until re-released on CD by Collector's Choice Music in late 2008.

Track listing
Side One
"Abracadabra (Have You Seen Her?)" (Secich, Bartolin)  – 3:05
"Dusty Old Fairgrounds" (Bob Dylan) - 2:46
"Plain to See" (Secich, Bartolin) - 2:41
"Just Another Game" (Secich, Bartolin) - 2:57
"I Remember A Time" (Secich, Bartolin) - 2:55
"Smash My Guitar" (Secich, Bartolin) - 3:15
Side Two
"Anytime At All" (John Lennon, Paul McCartney) - 2:19
"Here We Go Again" (Secich, Bartolin) - 3:23
"What Can I Do For You?" (Kendzor) - 3:50
"All I Want" (Secich, Bartolin) - 2:57
"Wasting My Time" (Secich, Bartolin) - 2:50
"Let There Be Rock" (Secich, Bartolin) - 2:33

Personnel 
Jim Kendzor – Lead vocals, rhythm guitar
Frank Secich – Bass guitar, background vocals
Bill "Cupid" Bartolin – Lead guitar, background vocals
David Evans – Drums, background vocals

References 

1973 debut albums
Blue Ash (band) albums
Mercury Records albums